, also referred to as , is a constituency of the House of Representatives in the Diet of Japan. It is located in southwestern Hyogo Prefecture and consists of the Hyōgo, Kita and Nagata wards of Kobe. As of September 2015, 357,643 eligible voters were registered in the district. It is one of the 48 districts in the Kansai region that form the Kinki proportional representation block.

The district was established as part of the electoral reform of 1994; the area was previously part of Hyōgo 1st district, which covered the whole of Kobe and elected five representatives by single non-transferable vote.

Since the district's creation, Kazuyoshi Akaba of the Komeito party has been elected in six of the seven elections held. Koichi Mukoyama of the Democratic Party of Japan won the seat from Akaba in the 2009 election which brought the DPJ to power. Akaba subsequently defeated Mukoyama in the December 2012 election.

List of representatives

Election results

See also
Hyogo at-large district, Hyogo Prefecture's district for the House of Councillors

References 

Districts of the House of Representatives (Japan)